The 2022 Waratah Cup was the 20th season of Football NSW's knockout competition. The preliminary rounds are now a part of the Australia Cup competition. 
The 4 winners from the Australia Cup preliminary Seventh round qualified for the Waratah Cup.

The Cup was won by NWS Spirit, their first title.

Format

Preliminary rounds

New South Wales clubs, other than Northern NSW and A-League clubs, participate in the 2022 Australia Cup via the preliminary rounds. The competition is for all Senior Men's teams of the National Premier Leagues NSW, NSW League One, NSW League Two, NSW League Three, as well as Association teams which applied to participate.

A total of 162 clubs entered into the competition, including 120 grassroots clubs. The four qualifiers were:

Semi finals

Grand final

Notes

References

Waratah Cup
Waratah Cup